Padraig "Paud" Costelloe (born 1989) is an Irish hurler who plays as a full-back for the Kerry senior team.

Born in Ballyduff, County Kerry, Costelloe first arrived on the inter-county scene when he first linked up with the Kerry minor team in both football and hurling before later joining the under-21 hurling side. He made his senior debut during the 2011 league. Costelloe quickly became a regular member of the starting fifteen and has won one Christy Ring Cup medal.

At club level Costelloe is a three-time championship medalist with Ballyduff.

Honours

Team

Ballyduff
Kerry Senior Hurling Championship (3): 2010, 2011, 2012
[[Kerry Under-21 Hurling Championship (1): 2010

Kerry
Christy Ring Cup (2): 2011 (sub), 2015
National League (Division 2A) (1): 2015

References

1989 births
Living people
Ballyduff (Kerry) hurlers
Kerry inter-county hurlers